The Kazakh opposition consists of groups and individuals in Kazakhstan seeking to challenge, from 1986 to 1991 the authorities of Soviet Kazakhstan, and since 1995, after the adoption of a new constitution and the transition from a parliamentary form of government to a presidential one, the leader country Nursultan Nazarbayev. After, Kassym-Jomart Tokayev. Part of Kazakh democracy movement. Supporters of the movement tend to call for a parliamentary democracy based on a Western model, with freedom of speech and political and religious pluralism.

History

1986 protests 

In December 1986, well-known and long-time First Secretary of the Central Committee of the Communist Party of Kazakhstan Dinmukhamed Kunaev was dismissed from his post and was replaced by Gennady Kolbin, an ethnic Russian which received discontent among the Kazakh public. Riots and clashes between protestors and police broke out on 17 December at the Brezhnev Square (now Republic Square) in Almaty and eventually spread to other parts in the city. As result, 168–200 people were killed and more than 200 were injured with large detentions taking place.

In June 1989, Kolbin was replaced by ethnic Kazakh, Nursultan Nazarbayev, who previously served as the Chairman of the Council of Ministers. After Nazarbayev's rise to power, Kazakhstan experienced in the rise of authoritarianism and corruption which faced opposition movements that were met with political repressions, eventually leading to a decline in civil activism and opposition in the country.

Democratic Choice of Kazakhstan (2001) 
On 17 November 2001, several known Kazakh officials and businessmen announced the creation of the Democratic Choice of Kazakhstan (QDT) where it revealed its policies of empowering parliament, direct elections for regional authorities, introducing election and judiciary reforms as well as granting more freedom to the media.

A sanctioned rally by the QDT with a support by the Communist Party of Kazakhstan (QKP) was held in Almaty on 20 January 2002. The QDT called for a referendum on the need to continue democratic reforms, stronger role for the Parliament in control of the government and Prosecutor General's Office, direct elections of äkıms and the development of local government. An estimated 2000–5000 people attended the demonstration.

Zhanaozen 2011 massacre 
Zhanaozen has been described as "a one-industry town... centered on the ageing oilfield of Ozen". In May 2011, workers from the Ozenmunaigas oil field went on strike for unpaid danger money, higher wages and better working conditions. The strike was declared illegal by local courts and the state oil company fired nearly 1000 employees. Some of the sacked workers then started a round-the-clock occupation of the town square in protest, demanding better union representation and recognition of workers' rights. The strike continued for months without official interference. According to Radio Free Europe, the protest expanded, "with demonstrators furious over what they saw as a stranglehold on collective bargaining and labor rights by the government." In mid-December, some workers in the square began calling for the right to form independent political parties free of the government's influence.
On 16 December, there were clashes between protesters and police who were attempting to evict them from the square in preparation for an Independence Day celebration. Activists claimed security officers opened fire on unarmed demonstrators. Authorities claimed that "bandits" infiltrated the protesters and began the riots first, producing video to support their version of events. Eleven were killed, according to government officials, though opposition sources put the death toll in the dozens.

2016 protests 
The 2016 Protests against land reforms in Kazakhstan were a massive, unauthorized protests that were held in Kazakhstan against the new amendments to the Land Code, which began on 24 April 2016 in the city of Atyrau. Three days later, the rallies were held in the cities of Aktobe and Semey. During the first three rallies, the authorities did not try to harshly suppress the protests, but tried to calm the protesters and offer other forms of dialogue. Only on May 21, the authorities thoroughly prepared to suppress any protests in all administrative centers of the republic.

2019 election of Kassym-Jomart Tokayev 

Protests broke out in the cities of Astana and Almaty on 9 June 2019. The protest itself was organized by a banned opposition group the Democratic Choice of Kazakhstan which is led by a former, now-exiled Kazakh banker Mukhtar Ablyazov. The Ministry of Internal Affairs reported that in Nur-Sultan, the protesters used throwing stones, objects that came to hand, and used pepper spray, which caused three police officers to be injured. According to official reports, the units of the Ministry of Internal Affairs, the police and the National Guard took measures to ensure public safety and law and order, the squares and streets were cleared of protesters by dispersal and detentions. According to the statement of the First Deputy of the Ministry of Internal Affairs Marat Kojaev, on 9 June, during the protests, about 500 people were detained among which were journalists. By 18 June, there were reports of the detainees of about 4,000 people in all cities of Kazakhstan.

2022 January events 

A series of mass protests that began in Kazakhstan on 2 January 2022 after a sudden sharp increase in liquefied gas prices following the lifting of a government-enforced price cap on 1 January. The protests began peacefully in the oil-producing city of Zhanaozen and quickly spread to other cities in the country, especially the nation's largest city Almaty, which saw its demonstrations turn into violent riots, fueled by rising dissatisfaction with the government and widespread poverty. During the week-long violent unrest and crackdowns, 227 people were killed and over 9,900 were arrested, according to Kazakh officials.

Opposition parties and organisations
Democratic choice of Kazakhstan

Democratic party

Alga Kazakhstan

Oyan, Qazaqstan

Atajurt Kazakh Human Rights

Mother's Assosation

Kok.team

Femenita

Opposition figures

Mukhtar Ablyazov
Barlyk Mendygaziyev
Marat Zhylanbayev
Jasaral Quanishalin
Mukhtar Dzhakishev
Aron Atabek†
Bella Orynbetova
Dulat Agadil†
Janbolat Mamai
Aidos Sadykov
Serikzhan Bilash
Abdel Mukhtarov

Symbols
Kazakh opposition supporters do not have an established flag, unlike the Belarus opposition. They usually use the Kazakh national flag and are associated with the colour blue.

References

External links

Political opposition
Political opposition organizations